Simona Halep was the defending champion, but lost in the second round to Magdaléna Rybáriková.

Petra Kvitová won the title, defeating Rybáriková in the final, 6–4, 6–2.

Seeds
The top two seeds receive a bye into the second round.

Draw

Finals

Top half

Bottom half

Qualifying

Seeds

Qualifiers

Lucky losers
  Caroline Garcia

Draw

First qualifier

Second qualifier

Third qualifier

Fourth qualifier

Fifth qualifier

Sixth qualifier

External links
 WTA tournament draws

Connecticut Open - Singles
Singles